Settai may refer to:

 Settai (film), Indian Tamil language film
 Settai (Lydia),  a town of ancient Lydia
 Settai Station, a railway station in Miyako, Iwate Prefecture, Japan